The main religion traditionally practiced in Latvia is Christianity. , it is the largest religion (68%), though only about 7% of the population attends religious services regularly. 

Lutheranism is the main Christian denomination among ethnic Latvians due to strong historical links with the Nordic countries and Northern Germany (see Hanseatic League), while Catholicism is most prevalent in eastern Latvia (Latgale), mostly due to Polish influence. The Latvian Orthodox Church is the third largest Christian church in Latvia, with adherents primarily among the Russian-speaking minority.

History

Latvia was one of the last regions in Europe to be Christianized. The inhabitants of the region that is now Latvia once practiced Finnic paganism and Baltic mythology, but this practice gradually diminished through the course of the centuries. In the 12th to 13th centuries Latvia first became part of the Catholic Church, as the Christian kings of Denmark, Sweden and the North German Livonian and Teutonic military orders fought for influence in the region in what later became known as the Northern Crusades.

Despite the Christianization, the local populace in the countryside maintained their pagan belief system for several centuries, with pockets of paganism surviving in Latvia up until the 17th century. Along with the rest of the traditional holidays, Christmas (Ziemassvētki) and Easter (Lieldienas) in Latvia still largely retain their pagan roots.

During the Protestant Reformation the teachings of Lutheranism from Northern Germany and Scandinavia completely changed the religious landscape in the country, and eventually only Latgale remained Catholic due to the influence of the Polish–Lithuanian Commonwealth. Before World War II, 2/3 of Latvia was Protestant; overwhelmingly Lutheran with scarce Calvinist population and individual cases of adhering to other Protestant confessions.

Because of the state policy of atheism during the Soviet era and the general European trend of secularization, religiosity declined drastically, and today a growing percentage of Latvians claims not to follow any religion, with low church attendance.

Demographics 
According to the Annual Report of Religious Organizations and their Activities published by the Ministry of Justice (MOJ), based on 2019 data (the most recent available), the largest religious groups are Lutheran (37 percent), Roman Catholic (18 percent), and Latvian Orthodox Christian (13 percent).

In a survey from 2015, the ISSP found that 62.6% of the Latvian population declared to belong to a Christian denomination, divided in 19.7% Russian Orthodox, 18.5% Roman Catholic, 17.8% Protestant, 6.1% Old Believers and 0.5% belonged to smaller Christian denominations. A further 36.7% declared to have No Religion and 0.7% declared to belong to other religions.

In the same year the Eurobarometer survey by the European Commission found different results, with 76.7% of the Latvians regarding themselves as Christians, divided in 26.2% Catholics  24.0% Eastern Orthodox, 16.6% Protestants, and 9.9% other Christians. The unaffiliated people made up the 22.0% of the respondents and were divided in Atheists with 4.7% and Agnostics with 17.3%.

The Latvian polling agency SKDS has also gathered information regarding the religious affiliation of Latvia over the years. In 2018, 26% of the population was Orthodox, 20% identified as Catholic while 17% was Lutheran, and 3% were Old Believers. 14% believed in God without being affiliated to any religion, while 15% declared themselves as atheist. A further 3% belonged to other Christian sects or religions.

Religion in Latvia, SKDS surveys 2000-2018

Religion in Latvia today 

The Evangelical Lutheran Church of Latvia has 708,773 members. The Catholic Church in Latvia has 430,000 members. Historically, the west and central parts of the country have been predominantly Protestant, while the east – particularly the Latgale region – has been predominantly Catholic, although Catholics are now common in Riga and other cities due to migration from Latgale. Historically, Lutherans were the majority, but Communist rule weakened Lutheranism much more than Catholicism, with the result that there are now only slightly more Lutherans than Catholics. The Latvian Orthodox Church is then-semi-autonomous and has 370,000 members. Orthodoxy predominates among the Latvian Russian population.

, the population of Jews in Latvia was 416; and there were several hundred Muslims in Latvia. Native Latvian ethnic religion is Dievturība.

The Reformed Church in Latvia is a small Reformed denomination with two congregations in Riga.

As of 2011, the Justice Ministry had registered 1145 congregations. This total included: Lutheran (294), Catholic (250), Orthodox (122), Baptist (94), Old Believer Orthodox (69), Pentecostal (52),  Seventh-day Adventist (51), Evangelical (39), New Generation (18), Muslim (17), Jehovah's Witnesses (15), Jewish (13), Methodist (12), New Apostolic (11), Hare Krishna (11), Dievturi (10), Buddhist (4), Church of Jesus Christ of Latter-day Saints (Mormons) (4), and 18 other congregations. In 2003, the Government also registered the Christian Scientists as a recognized religious congregation.

In 2011, churches in Latvia provided the following estimates of church membership to the Justice Ministry:

See also
Dievturība
Islam in Latvia

References

Further reading